The Helsinki urban area, is the largest taajama in Finland. It's located in the Uusimaa region in Finland and has about 1.23 million inhabitants as of 2019.

The urban area includes, among other areas, the city of Helsinki as well as the cities of Espoo, Kauniainen and Vantaa, and it is also connected to the towns of Kerava and Järvenpää, which form their own urban areas.

See also
Tampereen keskustaajama
List of urban areas in the Nordic countries

References

Geography of Helsinki
Espoo
Vantaa
Greater Helsinki

External links
Helsinki urban area map at Wikimedia Commons